Boye may refer to:

Boye (surname)
Boye County, in Hebei, China
Boye (band), the Serbian and former Yugoslav alternative rock band
Boye (dog), the poodle dog belonging to Prince Rupert of the Rhine
 Boye Brogeland (born 1973), Norwegian international bridge player

See also
 Boy (disambiguation)
 Boyde